Cyathostemon ambiguus is a member of the family Myrtaceae endemic to Western Australia.

It is found in an area along the south coast extending from the Great Southern and into the south western Goldfields-Esperance regions of Western Australia.

Taxonomy

Cyathostemon ambiguus was first described in 1869 by Ferdinand von Mueller as Astartea ambigua, but in 2012 was transferred to the genus, Cyathostemon, by Barbara Rye and Malcolm Trudgen.

References

ambiguus
Taxa named by Ferdinand von Mueller
Plants described in 1869